Kulto (Filipino for cult) is an adventure story arc of the Philippine comic strip series Pugad Baboy, created by Pol Medina Jr. This particular story arc lasts 41 strips long and was published in the Philippine Daily Inquirer from November 1995 to January 1996. In 1997, the story arc was reprinted in the ninth compilation of the comic strip series.

Synopsis
Bong Cabalfin, demands that his parents raise his daily allowance. They, however, refuse due to the eradication of the illegal numbers game jueteng, from which the good senator receives a payola. Suddenly, Bong's spending habits change, even to the extent of forcing himself to eat at fast food joints and his bodyguards to "BYOB" (buy their own food). He even has no time to go to school. Furthermore, his classmates notice him saying, "The end is near"; they suspect that he has just joined a doomsday cult. So Utoy, Paltik, Joma (three of Bong's classmates), together with Polgas, reorganize the Walang Payat Gang (WPG), a vigilante group they formed to combat Oplan Paglalanse (walang payat means nobody is thin in Filipino).

Knowing that the doomsday cult only recruits rich kids, Polgas volunteers to use his undercover agent skills to act as a rich dog with a lot of bling-bling. He rides off to school in his Porsche 959 (the Thunderdog) and uses a Rolex watch in a tossing game called tumbang-preso. He also eats expensive food at recess, such as caviar, truffles, and a special version of turon for congressmen.

Eventually, the cult takes Polgas (who is under the guise of J. Paul Gasti) into their fold. Within the cult, Polgas discovers a world full of gullibility, deceit, and embezzlement, especially from its freckled leader, Jonas Ignacio, otherwise known as Brother Jonas.

The WPG's surveillance of Brother Jonas reveals that he is a former Overseas Filipino Worker who stayed in Saudi Arabia for 16 years. Upon returning, a local religious fellowship duped him of all his earnings. Lonely and destitute, he contemplated committing suicide. His "freckles" are actually marks from golfers's spiked shoes trampling on him during a stampede at the Goma Cup Invitational Golf Tournament (an apparent suicide attempt).

Although he attends some of the cult's activities, Polgas is having a hard time gathering evidence, as secret messages to cultists are written on lumpia paper and eaten after reading. Brother Jonas eventually blows Polgas' cover during a "private chat" where he reveals that he had cross-referenced the Thunderdog with Porsche's master database of worldwide 959 owners. As it turns out, the list only shows one Filipino 959 owner - Polgas. The latter tries to explain that the car is nothing but a knockoff, but the cult leader retorts that he is not as gullible and dumb as his disciples.

Brother Jonas then reveals his master plan: He intends to bring the cult members to a place near Mt. Makiling in Laguna province to replicate the 1978 Peoples Temple mass suicide in Jonestown, Guyana. However, instead of drinking cyanide-spiked Kool Aid, the cultists would drink a so-called "Elixir of Doom" (EOD; dirty water from the taps of the city of Mandaluyong) to induce death by diarrhea. But since it is expected that Polgas would try to stop the event from taking place, Brother Jonas later unleashes his trump card: a super-stinky meat inspector named Boy Pantog that knocks him out with his body odor.

The cultists arrive at the site, only to find a group of UFO watchers already there. Brother Jonas argues with the group leader over who reserved the site first; eventually the cult goes to a dense part of the mountain. He then instructs his bodyguards to secure the perimeter in case some of the cultists back out at the last minute. Brother Jonas begins his suicide address, where he asks the cult members on whether they could live with the fact that Manuel Morato's plans to run as president in 1998 (which he lost) could set a precedent where various cabinet positions could be given to hairstylist Ricky Reyes and film director Carlo J. Caparas. The cultists say "No" - including Boy Pantog, who has Polgas at his left armpit.

The WPG discover that Polgas is captured and mount a rescue mission. Paltik extricates Polgas by using a grappler line from Utoy's Swiss army knife. At the same time, he attaches Boy Pantog's left arm to a balloon, sending him up. Paltik then tries to revive Polgas using a synthetic pheromone. The revival is partially completed when the guards capture Paltik and bring him to Brother Jonas - who then orders that he should drink the EOD first. He is about to lead the cultists into drinking the flasks when a resuscitated Polgas plays an audiotape of their earlier conversation from a false beer belly (which is a result of his visits to slimming salons and strenuous abdominal training). When Brother Jonas' bodyguards try to attack, Polgas knocks them out after he sets the recorder's volume to full blast to disorient them.

The cultists rebel when they realize that Brother Jonas will not drink the EOD along with them. His "gullible and dumb" remarks in the tape further enrages them. He suddenly runs off, using his sprinting experience from years of evading the clutches of man-raping Arabs in Saudi Arabia.

Meanwhile, Boy Pantog is released from the balloon. The UFO watchers see him coming down, mistaking him for an alien. His foul odor catches the group by surprise after he slams into the ground. They run off into the distance - towards Brother Jonas, who suddenly crumples under another stampede. Polgas and the WPG chance upon him, who then is offered a bottle of Perrier water. However, there is one catch: the lack of bubbles indicated the presence of EOD, which practically shocks Brother Jonas. Polgas points out that the EOD mixed with the water was diluted; although Brother Jonas will not die from diarrhea, it is now a lifelong illness.

Brother Jonas is then presented before Judge Tickolas Marshall, who sentences him to life in exile in Bacolod, Negros.

Miscellaneous trivia
 The special turon Polgas eats in this arc is a reference to an old news report in the mid-1990s which claimed that lawmakers in the Philippine House of Representatives spent millions of pesos in public funds for an order of turrón.
 To emphasize how stinky Boy Pantog's smell is, lyrics from Shaggy's hit, Boombastic, surround him ("A-mistah-hoba-hoba" and "Kaboom-bastik"). This is a play on the Filipino word "putok" (literally, "explosion"), which is used as a euphemism for bad body odor.
 Boy Pantog also wears a button bearing the phrase "I ♥ Saddam." This further corroborates Medina's running gag of describing Arabs with bad body odor.
 There is actually no such place in the province of Iloilo as Bacolod (which may be Bacolod, the provincial capital of Negros Occidental). However, Brother Jonas does correctly mention that the place is known for its chicken dishes, especially chicken inasal.
 Actor Roy Alvarez appears in this arc as the leader of the UFO watchers. At the time the story arc was published, the actor rose to notoriety for being an alleged mediator and spokesperson for extraterrestrials whose ships were sighted in the Philippines.
 This story arcs debuts Polgas's fake beer belly. Later story arcs (such as Apo Hikers) see him use it as a storage compartment whenever he wants to change his identity into Dobermaxx. He spent so many time to do his fake beer belly, from exercises to sauna sessions.
 Jonas begging that he rather die than be exiled in Bacolod City stems from belief from OFWs that their food consists of only chicken in  stereotypical Arab company canteens.

Pugad Baboy